Vivian Claude Walsh (1888–1950) was a  New Zealand engineer. Vivian and his English-born elder brother Austin Leonard (Leo) Walsh (1881–1951) were pioneers of New Zealand aviation. The Walsh brothers were sons of immigrants from Yorkshire to New Zealand.

Vivian and Leo built a British Howard Wright biplane, which Vivian first flew on 5 February 1911. This was the first recognised powered flight made in New Zealand.

They established the New Zealand Flying School in 1915 to train pilots for the Royal Flying Corps, building their own series of flying boat trainers.

He made pioneering airmail, air passenger, and air survey flights, but was unable to make these commercially viable, and in 1924 he sold the New Zealand Flying School assets to the New Zealand Government, and gave up all involvement in aviation.

Vivian died in 1950, and Leo in 1951. The Auckland Branch of the Royal Aeronautical Society, concerned to preserve the memory of the brothers' contribution, formed the Walsh Memorial Air Pageant Organisation. Several events raised significant monies for educational purposes - now administered via the New Zealand Aeronautical Trusts Ltd.

Other memorials include:
 A statue at Mission Bay to commemorate both Walsh brothers.
 The annual Walsh Memorial Scout Flying School run by the Scout Association of New Zealand. 
 Walsh Memorial Library at the Museum of Transport and Technology (MOTAT) in Auckland.

See also
 Richard Pearse
 George Bolt
 Bert Pither

References

1888 births
1950 deaths
New Zealand aviators